NPW is a gene that in humans encodes  Neuropeptide W protein.

Neuropeptide W (NPW) is an endogenous peptide ligand for GPR8 (MIM 600731), a G protein-coupled receptor.[supplied by OMIM]

References

Further reading